Walter Messias Júnior (born 13 May 1991) is a Brazilian professional footballer who plays as an attacking midfielder and forward for  club AC Milan.

Club career

Early career 
Messias started his senior career in the lower-tier, non-professional Italian divisions, being discovered by former Torino player and manager Ezio Rossi, who persuaded him to join Casale in 2015.

At the end of the 2017–18 season his team Gozzano was promoted to Serie C. He made his professional Serie C debut for Gozzano on 23 September 2018 in a game against Cuneo, starting the game and played the whole match. He scored his first professional-level goal on 26 September 2018, against Piacenza.

Crotone 
On 31 January 2019, Messias' rights were sold to Serie B club Crotone, who loaned him back to Gozzano until the end of the 2018–19 season. He finished his first professional-level season with 33 appearances (32 as a starter) and four goals. Messias made his Serie B debut for Crotone on 24 August 2019 in a game against Cosenza, starting the game and played the whole match. He was instrumental in Crotone's promotion to the Italian top flight (the second in the club history) by scoring six goals throughout the season, and was confirmed as part of the team squad for the 2020–21 Serie A campaign.

He scored his first Serie A goal on 25 October 2020 against Cagliari, followed by two braces in December against Spezia and Parma.

AC Milan 
In 2021, Messias joined AC Milan on a one year loan deal with an option to buy. He made his debut for the club on 4 October 2021, coming on as a substitute in a 3–2 win over Atalanta. On 24 November, he scored his first goal for Milan on his UEFA Champions League debut; he scored the only goal of a 1–0 group stage win over Atlético Madrid. Messias described his header as "the most important moment of [his] career".. On 1 December 2021, he received his first league start scoring a brace in a 3–0 away win for Milan against Genoa.

On 6 January 2022, against Roma, he scored the second goal in eventual 3–1 win.
On 17 January against Spezia, Messias last minute goal and potentially the winner was controversially disallowed by the referee due to a beforehand foul on his teammate, Ante Rebic, Spezia went on to score the second and win 2–1, the referee apologized to Milan players for the incident. On 19 February, he scored the opener against Salernitana in 2–2 draw. On 15 April, he scored against Genoa again to seal 2–0 win.
On 15 May he provided the assist to Leao against Atalanta in the first goal as Milan won 2–0, One week later Milan was crowned The Scudetto title after 11 year absence. Overall Messias contribution in the campaign was 5 goals and 2 assists in 26 matches.

On 7 July, Milan bought him despite the option to buy having already expired.

Personal life
A Brazilian by birth, Messias moved to Italy in 2011 together with his wife and son, joining his brother in Turin, where he started working in the delivery sector and playing football for an amateur team of the local Peruvian community in his free time.

Career statistics

Honours
AC Milan
Serie A: 2021–22

References

External links

 Profile at the AC Milan website
 

1991 births
Living people
Footballers from Belo Horizonte
Brazilian footballers
Association football forwards
Association football midfielders
Cruzeiro Esporte Clube players
Casale F.B.C. players
A.S.D. Calcio Chieri 1955 players
A.C. Gozzano players
F.C. Crotone players
A.C. Milan players
Eccellenza players
Serie D players
Serie C players
Serie B players
Serie A players
Brazilian expatriate footballers
Brazilian expatriate sportspeople in Italy
Expatriate footballers in Italy